Christopher Mitchell Driver (21 May 1948 – 22 February 2001) was a British actor known for his role in the BBC sitcom It Ain't Half Hot Mum as Gunner Nigel 'Parky' Parkin. His film credits include Here We Go Round the Mulberry Bush (1967), This, That and the Other (1969), The Sex Thief (1973) and What's Up Superdoc! (1978).

He appeared in two episodes of Only Fools and Horses ("May the Force Be With You", 1983 and "To Hull and Back", 1985), playing policeman Terry Hoskins. In addition he had parts in many other comedies such as: Keeping Up Appearances; Never the Twain and That's My Boy.

He died from cancer at the age of 52, a month before his father, actor Norman Mitchell, and in the same year as Kenneth MacDonald, another actor with a role as a gunner in It Ain't Half Hot Mum, who died of a heart attack aged 50.

References

External links

1948 births
2001 deaths
Deaths from liver cancer
Deaths from cancer in England
British male television actors
20th-century English male actors